Notodonta torva, the large dark prominent, is a moth of the family Notodontidae. The species was first described by Jacob Hübner in 1803. It is found in most of Europe (although it is a very rare immigrant to Great Britain), east to the China, Korea and Japan.

The wingspan is about 48 mm. Adults are on the wing from the end of April to August in two generations in western Europe.

The larvae mainly feed on Populus species (including P. tremula and P. nigra) and Salix species (including S. caprea, S. cinerea and S. phylicifolia). Larvae can be found in June and again from August to September. The species overwinters in the pupal stage.

Gallery

External links

Fauna Europaea
Lepidoptera of Belgium
Lepiforum e.V.

Notodontidae
Moths of Japan
Moths of Europe
Moths described in 1803
Taxa named by Jacob Hübner